WETX was an FM radio station broadcasting on a frequency of 99.5 MHz and licensed to the city of Vardaman, Mississippi. The music format was known as Blazin' 99.5.

WETX was last owned by Eternity Records Company, LLC.

The Federal Communications Commission cancelled WETX's license on October 18, 2021.

References

External links

Radio stations established in 2017
Radio stations disestablished in 2021
2017 establishments in Mississippi
2021 disestablishments in Mississippi
ETX
Defunct radio stations in the United States
ETX